Qeshlaq-e Juq, also rendered as Qeshlaq Jug, may refer to:
 Qeshlaq-e Juq-e Olya
 Qeshlaq-e Juq-e Sofla